Thallium trifluoride is the inorganic compound with the formula TlF3.  It is a white solid.  Aside from being one of two thallium fluorides, the compound is only of theoretical interest.  It adopts the same structure as bismuth trifluoride, featuring eight-coordinate Tl(III) centers.  Some evidence exists for a second polymorph.

References

Thallium compounds
Fluorides
Metal halides